Joy is an unincorporated community in Morgan County, Ohio, United States.  Sharps Fork Creek flows west of Joy.

The community is named for the Joy family, who were early settlers.  Joy had a post office, and was described in 1886 as "a hamlet of half a dozen houses".  Joy is also known as "Winfred". The post office was discontinued in 1924.

Joy Cemetery is located north of the community.

References

Unincorporated communities in Morgan County, Ohio
Unincorporated communities in Ohio